Andi Poedjakesuma (born November 8, 1980) is a retired Indonesian professional basketball player. He plays for Pelita Jaya Esia Jakarta of the Indonesian basketball league.  He is also a member of the Indonesia national basketball team.

Andi competed for the Indonesia national basketball team at the FIBA Asia Championship 2007 for the first time; he returned to the team for the FIBA Asia Championship 2009.

References

1980 births
Living people
Indonesian men's basketball players
Pelita Jaya Esia players
Small forwards
Southeast Asian Games silver medalists for Indonesia
Southeast Asian Games bronze medalists for Indonesia
Southeast Asian Games medalists in basketball
Competitors at the 2007 Southeast Asian Games
20th-century Indonesian people
21st-century Indonesian people